Jefferson Transit may refer to:

Jefferson Transit (Louisiana) in Jefferson Parish, Louisiana
Jefferson Transit (Washington) in Jefferson County, Washington State
Birmingham-Jefferson County Transit Authority in Jefferson County, Alabama